Tee is a given name. Notable people with the name include:

Tee A (born 1974), Nigerian comedian
Tee Corinne (1943–2006), American photographer, author
Tee Franklin, comic book writer
Tee Joe Gonzales (1862–1940), American politician and businessman
Tee Grizzley (born 1994), American rapper and video game streamer
Tee Higgins (born 1999), American football player
Tee Jay (1962–2006), Ghanaian-born British boxer
Tee Lopes (born 1987), Portuguese-American composer and sound designer
Tee Tee Luce (1895–1982), Burmese philanthropist 
Tee Martin (born 1978), American football coach and former player
Tee Masaniai, American Samoan politician
Tee Mitchell (1916–1970), American baseball player
Tee Scott (1948–1995), American DJ

See also
Tee-Y Mix, Nigerian record producer